Going may refer to:

Go (verb)
Going- to future, a construction in English grammar
Going (horse racing), the condition of a horse racing track surface.
Going (surname)
"Going!", a song by KAT-TUN
Way of going, a reference to the quality of movement in a horse gait
Going am Wilden Kaiser, an Austrian municipality
Going (motorcycle taxi), an alternative term for "Okada", a form of motorcycle taxi in Nigeria
Gogoing, Gao Di-Ping (born April 4, 1997), Chinese retired League of Legends profession player

See also

Going concern
Go (disambiguation)
Gowing
Gowin